"Photo Finish" is a 1965 Australian TV movie based on a play by Peter Ustinov. It screened on ABC and was produced by Oscar Whitbread and starred Frank Thring.

Thring played the role on stage the year before.

It was part of Wednesday Theatre. Australian TV drama was relatively rare at the time.

Plot
A writer is visited by ghosts from his past - himself at the ages of twenty, forty, and sixty.

Cast
Frank Thring as Sam Kinsale, aged 80
Elspeth Ballantyne
Michael Duffield as the father		
Beverley Dunn as the mother
Norman Ettling as the 40 year old		
Patricia Kennedy as Stella, the wife 		
Patsy King 		
Stanley Walsh as the 20 year old	
Raymond Westwell as the 60 year old

Production
A version of the play had been performed on ABC the previous year.

Reception
The Age said Thring "gave a striking performance" and praised the "sparkling dialogue".

The Sydney Morning Herald called it "excellent".

References

External links
 

1965 television plays
1965 Australian television episodes
1960s Australian television plays
Wednesday Theatre (season 1) episodes